HLA-B7 (B7) is an HLA-B serotype. The serotype identifies the more common HLA-B*07 gene products. (For terminology help see: HLA-serotype tutorial) B7, previously HL-A7, was one of the first 'HL-A' antigens recognized, largely because of the frequency of B*0702 in Northern and Western Europe and the United States. B7 is found in two major haplotypes in Europe, where it reaches peak frequency in Ireland. One haplotype A3-B7-DR15-DQ1 can be found over a vast region and is in apparent selective disequilibrium. B7 is a risk factor for cervical cancer, sarcoidosis, and early-onset spondylarthropathies.

Serology

Alleles

In disease

Cervical cancer
HLA-B7 along with HLA-DQ8 increased risk for cervical cancer in at risk Costa Rican women and Asian Indians

Sarcoidosis
A weak relationship between HLA-B7 and sarcoidosis has been known for 30+ years,  yet has not consistently been reproducible in all studies however.   A common serologically defined haplotype in Europeans is HLA A3-Cw7-B7-DR15-DQ6.2 which is composed of alleles A*0301:Cw*0701:B*0702:DRB1*1501:DQA1*0102:DQB1*0602. In persistent sarcoidosis this haplotype appears elevated, further study eliminated risk contributed by A3-Cw7 and DQ6.2 indicating B7-DR15 haplotype contains risk of disease (OR = 2.5). Corresponding region of chromosome 6 contains nearly one million nucleotides thus these genes, or another closely linked gene could be involved in such massing of inflammatory granulomata.

Juvenile Spondylarthropathies
In Croatian children, two HLA-B27 alleles were found associated with disease, B*2702, B*2705. The study showed also B*0702 in cooperation with B*27, the HLA-B*07/B*27 combination with D6S273-134 genomic marker allele and was found not to be the result of linkage disequilibrium. B*2705 was found to be dominant allele associated.

Haemochromatosis
The HFE gene responsible for haemochromatosis is distal on chromosome 6 from HLA-A and more so from HLA-B, the distance suffices (3 million nucleotides) to allow equilibration of the loci. Nonetheless, a linkage has been found between A3-B7 haplotype and haemochromatosis. The region is almost 1.4 million nucleotides in length and contains many other genes that could be involved. 
A more recent study looked at a number of linked gene-alleles and found I82-2:D6S265-1:HLA-A3:D6S128-2:HLA-F1:D6S105-8 was constantly associated while B7 appeared beyond the haplotype linked to disease.

Covid-19
In october 2021, a team of researcher from Centre hospitalier universitaire Sainte-Justine in Montreal, Canada, announced the discovery of HLA-B7 genetic marker as a potential cause for severe form of covid-19. While they noted that more work will be necessary to confirm this discovery, they found that individuals carrying the HLA-B7 genetic marker, which represents 35% of the population worldwide, are more likely to have a less effective immune response to covid-19.

References

0